Wang Qiang was the defending champion, but lost in the first round to Peng Shuai.

Sofia Kenin won the title, defeating Samantha Stosur in the final, 6–7(4–7), 6–4, 6–2. This marked Stosur's last appearance in a WTA singles final before her retirement in 2022.

Seeds

Draw

Finals

Top half

Bottom half

Qualifying

Seeds

Qualifiers

Lucky losers

Draw

First qualifier

Second qualifier

Third qualifier

Fourth qualifier

Fifth qualifier

Sixth qualifier

References

External links
 Main draw
 Qualifying draw

Guangzhou International Women's Open - Singles
2019 Singles